Van Alen Institute is a New York City-based independent nonprofit architectural organization, dedicated to improving design in the public realm. It was founded in 1894 as the Society of Beaux-Arts Architects. In 1995, the institute was named in honor of William Van Alen, architect of the Chrysler Building and recipient of the institute's 1908-1909 Paris Prize.

Van Alen Institute has supported architects, urban thinkers, designers, and scholars through design competitions, fellowships, awards and public programs. Also, it has fostered dialogue about architecture as a creative practice.

Van Alen Institute initiatives include Parks for the People and Ground/Work: A Design Competition for Van Alen Institute's New Street-Level Space. The institute is also a partner in Rebuild by Design and Changing Course: Navigating the Future of the Lower Mississippi River Delta.

Van Alen Institute is located at 303 Bond St in Gowanus, Brooklyn.

See also 
 Beaux-Arts Institute of Design (National Institute for Architectural Education), a defunct school related to the Society of Beaux-Arts Architects

References

External links

 Official Website
 Van Alen Institute Design Archive

Architecture organizations based in the United States